Eravangudy is a village in the Udayarpalayam taluk of Ariyalur district, Tamil Nadu, India.

Demographics 

As per the 2001 census, Eravangudy had a total population of 4489 with 2273 males and 2216 females.

References 

Villages in Ariyalur district